Columbia Hills State Park is a Washington state park located  east of Dallesport on SR 14 in Klickitat County. The park occupies  on Horsethief Lake, an impoundment of the Columbia River, and was created in 2003 with the merger of Horsethief Lake State Park and Dalles Mountain Ranch.

Activities and amenities
Several petroglyph panels that were saved from inundation by the nearby Dalles Dam have been installed in the park.

References

External links
Columbia Hills State Park Washington State Parks and Recreation Commission 
Columbia Hills State Park Map Washington State Parks and Recreation Commission

Parks in Klickitat County, Washington
State parks of Washington (state)